Royal Challengers Bangalore (RCB) is a franchise cricket team based in Bangalore, India, which plays in the Indian Premier League (IPL). They were one of the nine teams that competed in the 2012 Indian Premier League. They were captained by Daniel Vettori. Royal Challengers Bangalore finished fifth in the IPL and did not qualify for the Champions League T20.

Squad 
Players with international caps before the 2012 IPL season are listed in bold.

Indian Premier League season

Standings
Royal Challengers Bangalore finished fifth in the league stage of IPL 2012.

Match log

References

2012 Indian Premier League
Royal Challengers Bangalore seasons
2010s in Bangalore